General elections were held in Cuba on 1 June 1948. Carlos Prío Socarrás won the presidential election running under the Auténtico-Republican Alliance banner, whilst the Partido Auténtico emerged as the largest party in the House of Representatives, winning 29 of the 70 seats. Voter turnout was 78.7%.

Opinion polls

Results

President

Senate

House of Representatives

References

Cuba
General
Presidential elections in Cuba
Parliamentary elections in Cuba
Cuba
Election and referendum articles with incomplete results